The following is a partial list of compositions by Michael Finnissy.

Orchestral music, with or without choir 
 World (1968/74), for 6 voices, 2 flutes (both doubling piccolo and the second alto flute), 2 oboes (one doubling oboe d'amore, the other cor anglais), 2 clarinets (the second doubling E-flat clarinet), 2 piccolo trumpets, trombone, tuba, 3 percussionists, cimbalom, celesta, 2 pianos, harp, 2 violins, 2 violas, 2 cellos, 2 double basses [19']
 Medea (1973/2008), 5 voices and orchestra [6']
 Offshore (1975–76), for 3 flutes, 3 oboes, 3 clarinets, 3 bassoons, 4 horns, 3 trumpets, 3 trombones, 1 tuba, 3 percussionists, harpsichord, piano, 2 harps, and strings (12.10.8.6) [11']
 Sea and Sky (1979–80), for 4 flutes (2 doubling piccolo), 3 oboes, 2 clarinets (both doubling E-flat clarinet), 2 bassoons (the second doubling contrabassoon), 4 horns, 4 trumpets (each doubling piccolo trumpet), 3 trombones, tuba, timpani, 4 percussionists, 2 celestas, 2 harps, and strings (10.10.10.8.8) [22']
 East London Heys (1985–86), for string orchestra [40']
 Red Earth (1987–88), for 3 flutes, 3 oboes, 3 bassoons, 3 trumpets, 3 trombones, 2 didjeridus, 4 percussionists, 2 timpani, 2 harps, and strings [20']
 Eph-phatha (1988–89), for 2 flutes, oboe, clarinet, bassoon, horn, trumpet, trombone, percussion, harp, piano, and strings (3.3.3.3.1) [13']
 Glad Day (1994), for 2 recorders, 2 trumpets, chamber organ, theory or harp, and strings [13']
 Speak its Name! (1996), for 2 flutes, 2 oboes, 2 clarinets, 2 bassoons, 2 horns, 2 trumpets, trombone, 2 vibraphones, timpani, harp, quarter-tone keyboard, and strings (at least 8.8.6.6.3) [22']
 Onbevooroordeeld Leven (2000–02), for soloists (2 flutes, clarinet, drummer, accordion, and string quartet) and ensemble (2 oboes, clarinet, 2 bassoons, 2 horns, and strings (at least 2.2.2.2.1)) [23']
 Zortziko (2009), version ii, for orchestra [6']
 Mozart Requiem Completion (published 2013), for SATB soli, SATB choir, and chamber orchestra (2 basset horns, 2 bassoons, 2 trumpets in D, 3 trombones (alto, tenor, and bass), timpani, organ, and strings) [56']
 Remembrance Day (2013/14), for solo baritone, SATB choir, and orchestra (clarinet, basset horn, 2 bassoons, 2 trumpets, 3 trombones, 3 percussionists, piano, harp, and strings) [65']
 Janne (2015), for 2 flutes, 2 oboes, 2 clarinets, 2 bassoons, 4 horns, 2 trumpets, 3 trombones, glockenspiel, timpani, and strings [16']
 Mu-Fa (2016), for 2 groups, each consisting of flute, oboe, clarinet, bassoon, horn, trumpet, trombone, tuba, piano, vibraphone, and strings [15']
 Natural Behavior (2016–17), for piccolo, 2 flutes, 2 oboes, cor anglais, 2 clarinets, bass clarinet, 2 bassoons, 4 horns, 3 trumpets, 3 trombones, tuba, timpani, 3 percussionists, harp, piano, and strings [6']

Ensemble music (8+ players) 
 Song 2 (1968), for 2 flutes, 2 oboes, 2 clarinets, 2 bassoons, horn, 2 trumpets, and 3 cellos [4']
 Song 4 (1968), for 2 solo pianos, 2 flutes, 2 oboes, 2 bassoons, 2 trumpets, and 3 cellos [4']
 Song 10 (1971), for piccolo, oboe, cor anglais, 2 clarinets, contrabassoon, piano, electric organ, and 2 cellos [4']
 Piano Concerto No. 1 (1975/84), for solo piano, piccolo, flute, oboe, clarinet, bassoon, 2 horns, 2 trombones, celesta, 2 violins, viola, cello, and double bass [15']
 Piano Concerto No. 2 (1975–76), for solo piano, 2 alto flutes, 3 violins, 2 violas, 2 cellos, and 2 double basses [14']
 Pathways of Sun and Stars (1976), for 2 piccolos, oboe, 2 clarinets, bassoon, 3 horns, 3 trumpets, 3 trombones, 5 percussionists, 2 harps, violin, viola, cello, and double bass [20']
 Alongside (1979), for flute, oboe, clarinet, bassoon, horn, trumpet, trombone, percussion, piano, 2 violins, viola, cello, and bass [19']
 Teangi (1982), for flute (doubling piccolo), cor anglais, E-flat clarinet, clarinet, contrabassoon, 2 trumpets, percussion, vibraphone, celesta, and violin [6']
 Ouraa (1982–83), for piccolo, clarinet, bassoon, horn, trumpet, trombone, percussion, violin, viola, cello, and double bass [9']
 Câtana (1984), for flute, oboe, clarinet, percussion, piano, harp, violin, viola, and cello [16']
 Obrecht Motetten I (1988–89), for flute, clarinet, bassoon, trumpet, trombone, percussion, violin, viola, and cello [5']
 Obrecht Motetten III (1989), for solo viola, flute, oboe, clarinet, bassoon, horn, trumpet, trombone, percussion, 2 violins, cello, and double bass [9']
 Obrecht Motetten V (1991–92), for flute (doubling piccolo), 3 soprano saxophones, horn, 3 trumpets, 3 trombones, double bass, and piano [18']
 Various Nations (1992), for speaker, flute, clarinet, horn, percussion, guitar, violin, and cello [12']
 Mars + Venus (1993), for flute, oboe, clarinet, bassoon, horn, trumpet, trombone, vibraphone, piano, 2 violins, viola, cello, and double bass [14']
 L'Union Libre, (1997), for alto horn (or alto saxophone), 2 pianos, 3 ocarinas, viola, accordion, 2 detuned zithers, and 4 large drums [11']
 I'm on my Way (1998), for clarinet, bassoon, horn, trumpet, trombone, percussion, piano, violin, viola, cello, and double bass [6']
 Giant Abstract Samba (2002), version i, for solo clarinet and ensemble (flute, oboe, bassoon, contrabassoon, soprano saxophone, tenor saxophone, horn, 2 trumpets, trombone, bass trombone, tuba, and percussionist) [17']
 Greatest Hits Of All Time (2003), for solo oboe, piccolo, clarinet, hammer, violin, viola, cello, and piano [12']
 Fredener Lieder (2015), for small string orchestra (2 first violins, 2 second violins, 3 third violins, 2 violas, 2 cellos, and 1 double bass) [12']

Chamber music (2-7 players) 
 Cantet nunc aula caelestium (1962), for flute and piano [4']
 Afar (1966–67), for flute, cor anglais, 3 trumpets, percussion, and celesta [13']
 As when upon a tranced summer night (1966–68), for piano, percussion, and 3 cellos [18']
 Transformations of the vampire (1968–71), for clarinet, 3 percussionists, violin, and viola [14']
 Untitled piece in memory of Igor Stravinsky (1971), for flute, viola, and harp [6']
 Babylon (1971/2001), for flute, clarinet, violin, viola, cello, piano, and percussion [6']
 Evening (1974), for alto saxophone, horn, trumpet, percussion, harp, cello, and double bass [11']
 Lost Lands (1977), for E-flat clarinet, soprano saxophone, guitar, violin, and piano [20']
 Piano Concerto No. 3 (1978), for solo piano, oboe (doubling cor anglais), clarinet (doubling bass clarinet), 2 trombones, cello, and double bass [23']
 Kagami-Jishi (1979), for flute and harp [11']
 Nobody's Jig (1980–81), for string quartet [20']
 Jiseï (1981), for solo cello, flute, oboe, percussion, viola, and piano [9']
 Keroiylu (1981), for oboe, bassoon, and piano [8']
 Aijal (1982), for flute, oboe, and percussion [7']
 Banumbirr (1982/86), for flute, clarinet, violin, cello, and piano [9']
 Mississippi Hornpipes (1982/97), for violin and piano [10']
 Dilok (1982), for oboe and percussion [10']
 Independence Quadrilles (1982/95), for piano trio [8']
 Australian Sea Shanties, Set 3 (1983), for 3–4 recorders [10']
 Delal (1984/88), for oboe d'amore and percussion [9']
 String Quartet No. 1 (1984) [22']
 above earth's shadow. . . (1985), for solo violin, flute (doubling piccolo), clarinet, violin, viola, cello, and double bass [18']
 East London Heys (1985–86), version for string quartet [40']
 East London Heys (1985–86), version for wind quintet [40']
 Contretänze (1985–86), for flute, oboe, clarinet, percussion, violin, and cello [17']
 String Trio (1986) [30']
 Quabara (1988), for didjeridu and "junk percussion" [9']
 Obrecht Motetten II (1988), for mandolin, guitar, and harp [10']
 Obrecht Motetten IV (1990), for brass quintet (2 trumpets, horn, trombone, and tuba) [12']
 Kulamen Dilan (1990), for soprano saxophone or oboe, and percussion [10']
 In Stiller Nacht (1990/97), for piano trio [9']
 Two Motets (1991), for counter-tenor and guitar [8']
 Plain Harmony (1993), version ii, for string quartet [10']
 Quelle (1994), for 2 soprano saxophones and 2 contrabass saxophones [3']
 Traum des Sängers (1994), for clarinet, guitar, vibraphone, violin, viola, cello, and double bass [15']
 Sefauchi's Return (1994), for flute, oboe, clarinet, and piano [2']
 Violet, Slingsby, Guy and Lionel (1994–96), for 2 euphoniums and 2 tubas [7'] (arranged from the larger piece for piano, multiple players)
 Different Things (1996), for clarinet quintet [6']
 Selected Movements of Great Masters (1996), for 2 alto saxophones and 2 tenor saxophones [11']
 Sehnsucht (1997), for string quartet [4']
 Multiple forms of constraint (1997), for solo violin and string trio [14']
 Un chant d'amour par JEAN GENET (1999–2000), for piano trio [26']
 Two Uncharacteristic Marches with a Trio (1999–2000), for wind quintet [3']
 Bright Future ignoring Dark Past (1999–2000), for piano trio [4']
 Necessary and more detailed thinking (2000), for piano trio [3']
 Judgement in that day (2000), for oboe, clarinet, violin, viola, cello, and piano [8']
 Casual Nudity (2000–01), for bass flute, percussion, guitar, double bass, and piano [12']
 Kreuzfidel Polka Op. 301 by Johann Strauss II (2000), for violin, cello, double bass, piano, and percussion [4']
 Shady Love (2001), for horn, violin, cello, piano, and percussion [4']
 Regen beschreiben (2001), for alto flute, clarinet, violin, cello, and piano [2']
 Smallish Foxtrot (2001), for flute, violin, viola, double bass, piano, and percussion [1']
 Open Window (2001), for trumpet, double bass, and piano [9']
 'k zal u (2001), for piano trio [4']
 D'Woaldbuama: Einleitung und Pastorale in Ländlerstyl nach Johann Strauss (sohn) (2001), for clarinet, violin, cello, double bass, piano, and percussion [7']
 Kritik der Urteilskraft (2001), for flute, clarinet, violin, cello, and piano [29']
 À propos de Nice (2001–02), for piano trio [24']
 Alternative Readings (2002), for flute, cello, and piano [8']
 Giant Abstract Samba (2002), version ii, for clarinet, violin, cello, piano, and percussion [17']
 Springtime (2003), for flute, clarinet, violin, cello, and piano [15']
 Diamond Suburbia (2003), for alto flute, clarinet, violin, harp, and piano [2']
 Blancmange (2003), for clarinet, guitar, phonofiddle, and piano [4']
 June (2003), for piano trio [4']
 Kann Liebe ewig bestehen? (2003), for alto flute, bass clarinet, trombone, violin, cello, and piano [8']
 Six Sexy Minuets Three Trios (2003), for string quartet [20']
 Civilisation (2004/13), for string quartet [17']
 L'Herbe (2004), for clarinet, guitar, quarter-tone vibraphone, and nude actor [11']
 Judith Weir (2004), for piano trio, and melodica or similar [5']
 That ain't Shit (2004), for clarinet, violin, piano, and optional drum-kit [12']
 Venice Vipers (2004), for solo violin, accompanied by guitar, violin, cello, and harpsichord [19']
 Young Brethren (2005), for clarinet, bass clarinet, violin, cello, piano, and percussion [11']
 Manik Asie (2005), for flute, guitar, and percussion (glockenspiel and vibraphone) [1']
 Scotch Tape (2006), for clarinet (or violin), cello, and piano [3']
 Possession (du condamné) (2006), for clarinet (or violin), cello, and piano [10']
 Jive, for violin and piano [1']
 Second String Quartet (2006–07) [14']
 Ho' Hoane (2007), for string quartet and piano [1'] (also for piano 4-hands)
 Grieg Quintetettsatz (2007), for string quartet and piano [25']
 Clarinet Sonata (2007), for clarinet and piano [12']
 Violin Sonata (2007), for violin and piano [25']
 Bassoon Sonata (2007), for bassoon and piano [12']
 Yob Cultcha (or 'Keep taking the Tabloids') (2007–08), for mandolin, violin, and accordion [3']
 Piano Quartet in G minor, 1861 (2009), for violin, viola, cello, and piano [18']
 Piano Quartet in A major, 1861–2 (2009), for violin, viola, cello, and piano [24']
 De Allerheiligste Ledematen (2010), for violin, viola, cello, and piano
 Âwâz-e Niyâz (premièred 2012), for new oboe (doubling lupophon) and piano [55']
 Piano Quintet in B flat major (EG 118) (published 2013), a completion of an unfinished Grieg work [30']
 Continuation and Coda to the unfinished Contrapunctus in The Art of Fugue (2013), version i, for string quartet [6']
 Continuation and Coda to the unfinished Contrapunctus in The Art of Fugue (2013), version ii, for piano trio [6']
 Horn Trio (2013), for violin, horn, and piano [30']
 Mad Men in the Sand (2013), for string quartet [3']
 Chi Mei Ricercari (published 2015), for cello and piano [28']
 Don't insult our intelligence (2015), for flute, trombone, violin, viola, double bass, and piano [4']
 Basic Ragtime (published 2016), for 3 violins, cello, and piano [17']
 Clarinetten-Liederkreis (2016), for clarinet and string quartet [14']
 Einfältiger-Liederkreis (2016), for clarinet (or violin) and piano [14']
 Normal Deviates (2017), for two guitars [10']
 Sorrow and its beauty (2017), for erhu and piano [12']
 Opera of the Nobility (2017), for soprano saxophone, percussion, and piano [15']
 Tussen Rede en Gevoel (In between Reason and Feeling) (2018) 2 bass clarinets, violoncello, double bass [19']

Solo piano music 
 Song 5 (1966–67) [7']
 Song 8 (1967) [11']
 Romeo and Juliet are drowning (1967–73) [4']
 Strauss-Walzer (1967–1989) [10']
 "Wo di Zitronen bluhn"
 "O, schöner Mai"
 "Geschichten aus dem Wienerwald"
 Song 6 (1968, rev. 1996) [3']
 Autumnall (1968–71) [5']
 Song 9 (1968) [7']
 Song 7 (1968-69) [4']
 23 Tangos (1968–98) [45']
 Snowdrift (1972) [10']
 Freightrain Bruise (1972–80) [3']
 Verdi Transcriptions (1972–2005) [180']
 Book 1
 Oberto. Atto II. Aria: 'Sciagatura! a questo lido ricercai l'amante infido!'
 Un giorno di regno. Atto I. Trio: 'Bella speranza in vero'
 Nabucco. Parte II. Chorus: 'Il maledetto no ha fratelli'
 I Lombardi. Atto III. Chorus: 'Fra tante sciagure...'
 Ernani. Parte I. Septet with Chorus: 'Vedi come il buon vegliardo...'
 I due Foscari. Atto III. Choral Barcarolle: 'Iace il vento, è quèta l'onda'
 Giovanna d'Arco. Atto I. Aria: 'So che per via di triboli'
 Alzira. Atto II. Duet: 'Il pianto..l'angoscia..di lena mi priva'
 Attila. Atto I. Aria: 'Mentre gonfiarsi l'Anima'
 Book 2
 X. Attila. Prologo. Duetto: 'Vanitosi! Che abietti e dormenti'
 XI. Macbeth. Atto IV. Coro: 'Patria oppressa! Il doce nome...' (1847)
 XII. I masnadieri. Parte III. Duetto: 'Qual mare, qual terra...'
 XIII. Jérusalem. Acte I. Récit et duo: 'Non, ce bruit, ce n'est rien...'
 XIV. Il corsaro. Atto I. Romanza: 'Non so le tetre immagini'
 XV. La battaglia di Legnano. Atto IV. Inno di Vittoria: 'Dall'Alpi a Caridi e echeggi vittoria!'
 XVI. Luisa Miller. Atto II. Scena e quartetto: 'Rea fucina d'empie frodi...'
 XVII. Stiffelio. Atto III. Duetto: 'Opposto è il calle che in avvenire XVIII. Rigoletto. Atto I. Scena e coro: 'Vendetta del pazzo! Contr'esso un rancore'
 Book 3
 XIX. Rigoletto. Atto III. Canzone: 'La donna è mobile'
 XX. Il trovatore. Atto IV, prima scena. Duo: 'Vivrà! Contende il giubilo'
 XXI. La Traviata. Atto III. Duetto: 'È nulla, sai?'
 XXII. Les vêpres siciliennes. Acte V, scène II. Boléro: 'Merci, jeunes amies, d'un souvenir si doux!'
 XXIII. Simon Boccanegra. Finale dell'atto I. Scena: 'Tradimento!'
 XXIV. Aroldo. Atto IV. Coro, Burrasca e Finale: 'Allora che gl'anni...'
 XXV. Un ballo in maschera. Atto I. Stretta: 'Ogni cura si doni al diletto'
 XXVI. La forza del destino. Atto I. Romanza: 'Me pellegrina ed orfano'
 XXVII. Macbeth. Atto II. Aria (a) 'Trionfai! Securi alfino' (1847); (b) 'La luce langue' (1864–5)
 Book 4
 XXVIII. Macbeth. Atto I. Chorus: 'S'allontanarono! N'accozzeremo'
 XXIX. Don Carlos (1866–7). (a) Acte II, tableau II. Duo: 'Restez! Auprès de ma personne'; (b) Acte IV, tableau I. Duo: 'J'ai tout compris'
 XXX. Aida. Atto III. Romanza: 'O cieli azzuri...'
 XXXI. String Quartet. (a) III. Prestissimo; (b) IV. Scherzo Fuga
 XXXII. Simon Boccanegra. Atto II. Aria: 'Cielo, pietoso, rendila'
 XXXIII. Don Carlo. Atto V. Aria: 'Tu che la vanità conoscesti'
 XXXIV. Otello. Finale dell'atto III. (a) Ballet No. 3: 'Chanson grecque (Cancone greca); (b) Scena: 'Una gran nube turba'
 XXXV. Falstaff. Parte I dell'atto III. 'Brava! Quelle corna saranno la mia gioia!'
 XXXVI. Messa da Requiem. Requiem aeternam
 Svatovac (1973–74) [2']
 Ives – Grainger – Nancarrow Ives (1974) [4']
 Grainger (1979) [4']
 Nancarrow (1980) [4']
 Gershwin Arrangements (1975–88) [40']
 How long has this been going on?
 Things are looking up
 A foggy day (in London Town)
 Love is here to stay
 They can't take that away from me
 Shall we dance?
 But not for me
 Fidgety feet
 Embraceable you
 Waiting for the sun to come out
 Innocent ingenue baby
 Blah, blah, blah
 Boy wanted
 Jazz – Fast Dances, Slow Dances – Boogie-Woogie Jazz (1976) [5']
 Fast Dances, Slow Dances (1978–79) [18']
 Boogie-Woogie (1980/96) [4']
 Three Dukes went a-Riding (1977/96), [4']
 English Country-Tunes (1977/82–85), [52']
 "Green Meadows" [11']
 "Midsummer Morn" [5']
 "I'll give my Love a Garland" [10']
 "May and December" [7']
 "Lies and Marvels" [4']
 "The seeds of Love" [4']
 "My bonny boy" [7']
 "Come beat the Drums and sound the Fifes" [4']
 all.fall.down (1977) [8']
 To & Fro (1978/95) [4']
 Kemp's Morris (1978), "for pianist wearing Morris-bells" [5']
 We'll get there someday (1978) [3']
 Piano Concerto No. 4 (1978/96) [20']
 Short but. . . (1979) [3']
 Piano Concerto No. 6 (1980–81) [12']
 Liz (1980–81) [1']
 Free Setting (1981/95) [8']
 Reels (1980–81) [8']
 White Rain (1981) [5']
 Stomp (1981) [9'] (also for accordion)
 Terekkeme (1981–90) [5'] (also for harpsichord)
 Hikkai (1982–83) [5']
 Australian Sea Shanties, Set 2 (1983) [3']
 B.S.–G.F.H. (1985–86) [4']
 Taja (1986) [5']
 Wee Saw Footprints, "plus appendix of four teaching pieces and juvenilia" (1986–90) [15']
 Lylyly li (1988–89) [8']
 Pimmel (1988–89) [3']
 Stanley Stokes, East Street 1836 (1989/94) [3']
 More Gershwin (1989–90) [34']
 Limehouse Nights
 Wait a bit, Susie
 I'd rather Charleston
 Isn't it wonderful?
 Nobody but you
 Swanee
 Dixie Rose
 Someone believes in you
 Nashville nightingale
 Sometimes I. . . (1990) [3']
 Can't Help Lovin' Dat Man (1990) [12']
 Two of Us (1990) [2']
 My Love Is Like a Red Red Rose (1990) [3']
 De toutes flours (1990) [4']
 William Billings (1990–91) [4']
 New Perspectives on Old Complexity (1990–92) [5']
 How dear to me (1991) [3']
 Vanèn (1991) [3']
 Rossini (1991) [3']
 There never were such hard times before (1991) [2']
 French Piano (1991) [6']
 Willow Willow (1991) [2']
 Cibavit eos (1991–92) [3']
 Poor Stuff (1991–96) [2']
 Nine Romantics (1992) [25']
 Wenn wir in höchsten Nöten sein (1992) [4']
 A solis ortus cardine (1992) [2']
 John Cage (1992) [3']
 Cozy Fanny's Tootsies (1992) [2']
 What the meadow-flowers tell me (1993) [3']
 Folklore I–IV (1993–94) [78']
 Folklore I for Edvard Grieg [12']
 Folklore II for Michael Tippett [30']
 Folklore III for Brian Ferneyhough [20']
 Folklore IV for Rodney Lister [16']
 The larger heart, the kindlier hand (1993) [1']
 . . .desde que naçe (1993) [1']
 Yvaroperas (1993–95) [20']
 Yvaroperas 1 and 2 Yvaroperas 3 and 4 Yvaropera 5 Elephant (1994) [2']
 Violet, Slingsby, Guy and Lionel (1994–96) [18']
 Ethel Smyth (1995) [4']
 The History of Photography in Sound (1995–2001) [328']
 I. Le démon de l'analogie [28']
 II. Le réveil de l'intraitable réalité [21']
 III. North American Spirituals [24']
 IV. My parents' generation thought War meant something [36']
 V. Alkan – Paganini [14']
 VI. Seventeen Immortal Homosexual Poets [34']
 VII. Eadweard Muybridge – Edvard Munch [26']
 VIII. Kapitalistisch Realisme (mit Sizilianische Männerakte en Bachsche Nachdichtungen) [68']
 IX. Wachtend op de volgende uitbarsting van repressie en censuur [17']
 X. Unsere Afrikareise [31']
 XI. Etched bright with sunlight [29']
 Tracey and Snowy in Köln (1996) [2']
 Honky Blues (1996) [4']
 Georghi Tutev (1996/2002) [6']
 Tu me dirais (1996) [3']
 meeting is pleasure, parting a grief (1996) [1']
 Enough (2001) [17']
 Deux Airs de Geneviève de Brabant (Erik Satie) (2001)
 Edward (2002) [2']
 Joh.Seb.Bach (2003) [3']
 Von Gloeden Postcards (2003)
 Erscheinen ist der herrliche Tag (2003) [3']
 One Minute W... (2006) [1']
 First Political Agenda (1989–2006) [22']
 Wrong place, wrong time [3']
 Is there any future for new music? [9']
 You know what kind of sense Mrs. Thatcher made. [10']
 Zwei Deutsche mit Coda [8']
 Sonata for Toy Piano (2006–07) [6'] (also for toy piano)
 Second Political Agenda (2000–08)
 ERIK SATIE like anyone else (2000–01) [20']
 MIT ARNOLD SCHOENBERG (2002) [23']
 SKRYABIN in itself (2007–08) [21']
 Preambule zu "Carnival," gefolgt von der ersten und zweiten symphonischen Etüde nach Schumann (2009/10) [11']
 Koralforspill (2012) [33']
 Z/K (2012) [13']
 Beat Generation Ballads (2013) [47']
 Lost But Not Lost [2']
 Naked Original Skin Beneath Our Dreams & Robes of Thought [3']
 Lonely Banna Strand [6']
 Evans, Harry, Scott, Hearts Foolish [2']
 Veränderungen [34']
 Beethoven's Robin Adair (2015) [25']
 Brahms-Lieder (2015) [12']
 Third Political Agenda (2016)
 Corruption, Deceit, Ignorance, Intolerance Hier kommt 'U K Ichbezogen Populismus My country has betrayed me
 written with Cassandra Miller, Sinner don't let this Harvest pass (2016)
 Vervollständigung von Schuberts D840 (2016/17) [25']
 Could I Sing With Angels (2018) [3']
 Fifth Political Agenda (2020) [12']
 The Emptiness of What Comes Before
 Utopian Systems
 Leek Dumplings

 Piano music, multiple players 
 Wild Flowers (1974), for 2 pianos [12']
 Duet (1975–2007), for piano 4-hands [10']
 Violet, Slingsby, Guy and Lionel (1994–96), "22 short pieces for beginners and their teachers" [18'] (selections also for 2 euphoniums and 2 tubas)
 his voice / was then / here waiting (1996), for 2 pianos [8']
 Eighteenth-Century Novels (Fanny Hill) (2006), for 2 pianos [20']
 Ho' Hoane (2007), for piano 4-hands [1'] (also for string quartet and piano)
 Deux jeunes se promènent à travers le ciel 1929 (2008), for piano 4-hands [3']
 Fem ukarakteristiske marsjer med tre tilføyde trioer (2008–09), for piano 4-hands [15']
 Stille Thränen (2009), for piano 4-hands [8']
 Zortziko (2009), version i, for piano 4-hands [6']
 Derde symfonische etude (2013), for 2 pianos [15']

 Other solo instrumental music 
 Untitled Piece (1967), for flute [6']
 Xunthaeresis (1967), for organ [7']
 First Sign A Sharp White Moon, as if the cause of Snow (1968–75), for solo alto flute
 Song 13 (1971), for violin [3']
 Song 12 (1972–76), for bass clarinet [4']
 Alice (1970/75), for double bass [6']
 Ru Tchou (1975), for drummer [9']
 Song 17 (1976), for guitar [4']
 Song 18 (1976), for double bass [3']
 All the trees they are so high (1977) [5']
 Doves Figary, version i (1976–77), for cello [7']
 Doves Figary, version ii (1981), for cello [7']
 Pavasiya (1979), for oboe d'amore [8']
 part of Pavasiya – Sikangnuqa – Talawva
 Sikangnuqa (197), for flute [8']
 part of Pavasiya – Sikangnuqa – Talawva
 Hinomi (1979), for percussion [8']
 Stomp (1981), for accordion [9'] (also for piano)
 Andimironnai (1981), for cello [9']
 Yalli (1981), for cello [10']
 Terekkeme (1981–90), for harpsichord [5'] (also for piano)
 Marrngu (1982), for E-flat clarinet [8']
 Nasiye (1982), for guitar [8']
 Gerhana (1981–82), for percussion [12']
 Cirit (1982), for C clarinet [7']
 Sepevi (1982–83), for double bass [9']
 Ulpirra (1982–83), for bass flute [4']
 Uzundara (1983), for B-flat clarinet [9']
 The Eureka Flag (1983), for piccolo [4']
 Ének (1990), for violin [9']
 Organ Symphony No. 1 (2002–03) [18']
 Organ Symphony No. 2 (2003–05) [16']
 Sing to me of Heaven (2005–07), for organ [3']
 Sonata for Toy Piano (2006–07), for toy piano [6'] (also for standard piano)
 Organ Symphony No. 3 (1962–64/2006–08) [16']
 Organ Symphony No.4 (2006–08) [24']
 Two scenes from 'Shameful Vice (published 2007), for harp [6']
 Bryd frem mit hjertes trang (2009), for organ [4']
 En krybbe er hans første eie (2009), version i, for organ [5']
 Midt Igjennem Nød Og Fare Veien Går Til Paradis, for organ [5']
 Dum transissent Sabbatum' double (2016-18), for organ [7']
 Videte Miraculum' double (2016-18), for organ [6']
 Mankind Remix I (2020) for bass clarinet [3]

 Vocal music 
 Le Dormeur du Val (1963–68), for mezzo-soprano, celesta, harpsichord, piano, 2 violins, viola, and cello [7']
 From "The Revelations of Saint John the Divine" (1965-70), for high soprano, flute, 2 violins, 2 violas, and 2 cellos [7']
 Horrorzone (1965, rev. 1987), for soprano, flute, cor anglais, vibraphone, and piano [8']
 Song 1 (1966), for soprano [4']
 Song 3 (1969), for soprano, cor anglais, horn, piano, and electric organ [3']
 Song 11 (1969–71), for soprano and clarinet [4']
 Folk Song Set (in memory of Percy Grainger) (1969–76)
 For version i [15'], see vocal music accompanied by ensemble.
 version ii, for mezzo-soprano, flute, clarinet, violin, viola, cello, and piano [13']
 version iii, for mezzo-soprano, flute, oboe, piano, and percussion [13']
 Irma Cortez (1970–76), for baritone, silent actors, bassoon, percussion, accordion, piano, harp, violin, and double bass [30']
 Song 15 (1971/73), for soprano [4'] 
 Tsuru-Kame (1971–73), for soprano or contralto, small female choir, flute, viola, and 2–3 percussionists [21']
 Commedia dell'incomprensibile potere che alcune donne hanno sugli uomini (1973–75), for soprano, countertenor, cello, and harpsichord [12']
 Orfeo (1974) [6']
 version i, for 6 voices, 3 trombones, 2 lutes, percussion, and double bass
 version ii, for mezzo-soprano
 Bouffe (1975), for voice [5']
 Song 14 (1975), for soprano [4']
 Tom Fool's Wooing (1975–78), for high soprano, 3 sopranos, mezzo-soprano, 2 contraltos, counter-tenor, 2 tenors, and 2 basses [20']
 Song 16 (1976), for soprano [5']
 Mystery 1, "The Parting of Darkness From Light" (1976), for 2 tenors, 2 baritones, and bass [16']
 Mine Eye Awake (1977) [6']
 Mystery 3, "Noah and the Great Flood" (1978), for tenor, 2 actors, alto recorder, cor anglais, and 3 percussionists [16']
 Ohi! ohi! ohi! (1978), for voice [5']
 Mountainfall (1978), for mezzo-soprano [8']
 Goro (1978), for tenor, flute, clarinet, harp, violin, viola, and cello [20']
 Sir Tristran (1978), for soprano, clarinet, piano, violin, viola, and cello [20']
 Mystery 4, "The Prophecy of Daniel" (1979), for soprano, alto, tenor, and bass [15']
 Talawva (1979), for mezzo-soprano, flute, oboe, piano, and percussion
 . . . fairest noonday . . . (1979), for tenor and piano [8']
 Piano Concerto No. 5 (1980), for solo piano, mezzo-soprano, flute (doubling alto flute), oboe (doubling oboe d'amore), and vibraphone [22']
 Lord Melbourne (1980), for soprano, clarinet, and piano [12']
 Green Bushes (1980), for contralto and piano [12']
 Duru-Duru (1981), for mezzo-soprano, flute, piano, and percussion [9']
 Kelir (1981), for 2 sopranos, contralto, tenor, baritone, and bass [17']
 Anninnia (1981–82), for soprano and piano [11']
 Warara (1982/91), for soprano, flute, clarinet, percussion, violin, and cello [9']
 Lyrics and Limericks (1982–84), for voice and piano [10']
 Le Lay de la Fonteinne (1983/90), for mezzo-soprano, flute (doubling piccolo), oboe, and vibraphone or piano [22']
 Soda Fountain (1983), for soprano, mezzo-soprano, contralto, and tenor [20']
 Botany Bay (1983–89), for mezzo-soprano, flute, and oboe or clarinet [4']
 Cabaret Vert (1985), for mezzo-soprano, flute, cor anglais, and percussion [10']
 Beuk o'Newcassel Sangs (1988), for soprano, clarinet, and piano [12']
 Unknown Ground (1989–90), for baritone and piano trio [25']
 Same as We (1990), version ii, for mezzo-soprano, alto flute, and cimbalom [10']
 The Cambridge Codex (1991), for soprano, flue (doubling piccolo), percussion (2 bells), violin, and cello [18']
 Seven Sacred Motets (1991), for soprano, alto, tenor, and bass [35'] (also for SATB choir)

 Three Motets, Two Interludes (1991/2006), for soprano and string trio [16']
 "Western Wind" Kyrie (1991), for soprano, alto, tenor, and bass [3'] (also for SATB choir)
 Liturgy of Saint Paul (1991–95), countertenor, 2 tenor, baritone, and chamber organ [37']
 Thérése Raquin (1992/2005), for 2 countertenors, 2 baritones, and piano [120']
 Blessed be [5']
 version i, for soprano, double bass, and piano (1992)
 version ii, for tenor, flute, horn, guitar, harp, and cello (1995)
 version iii, for soprano, recorder, and piano (1996)
 Silver Morning (1993), for tenor or baritone, piano, and string quartet [16']
 Shameful Vice (1995), for 2 sopranos, mezzo-soprano, tenor, baritone, bass, 2 clarinets, 2 trumpets, guitar, harp, 2 violins, and double bass [45']
 Not Afraid (1998), for baritone and speaking pianist [12']
 Whitman (2004–05), for voice and piano [60']
 Salomé (2002), for soprano and piano [3']
 Now (2005), for 2 sopranos, alto, tenor, and 2 basses [4']
 Brighton! (2005–06), for tenor and string quartet [16']
 Caithness with Descants (2007), for soprano, recorder, and piano [3']
 Outside Fort Tregantle (2007–08), for baritone and piano [3']
 En krybbe er hans første eie (2009), version ii, for soprano, clarinet, guitar, cello, piano, and percussion [5']
 Gesualdo: Libro Sesto (2012–13), for 2 sopranos, 2 altos, 2 tenors, and 2 basses [31']
 Hier ist mein Garten (2015), for soprano and piano [8']
 Andersen-Liederkreis (2016), for soprano and piano [45']
 Zu fragen (2017), for alto and piano [10']
 Recordare (2018), for mezzo-soprano and piano [6']

 Music with choir 
 Circle, Chorus and Formal Act (1973), for baritone, 2 female choirs, 9+1 percussionists, oboe (doubling cor anglais), and 2 horns [23']
 Cipriano (1974), for tenor and choir of 9 voices (high soprano, 2 sopranos, mezzo-soprano, counter-tenor, tenor, baritone, and 2 basses)
 Mystery 6, "The Annunciation" (1978–79), soprano, tenor, bass, female choir (6 sopranos, 6 altos), speaker, 7 trumpets, 3 trombones, 3 percussionists, 2 celestas, 4 violins, 4 violas, and cello [20']
 Mystery 8 (unknown date), for choir, 3 flutes, 3 horns, 7 trumpets, 3 trombones, percussion, and strings [25']
 Australian Sea Shanties, Set 1 (1983), for SAB choir [9']
 Ngano (1983–84), for mezzo-soprano, tenor, double SATB choir, flute, and 2 percussionists [18']
 Haiyim (1984), for SATB choir (of at least 12 voices) and 2 cellos [15']
 Maldon (1990), for baritone, SATB choir, 2 trombones, 2 percussionists, and organ [20']
 Seven Sacred Motets (1991), for SATB choir [35'] (also for soli)
 Anima Christi (1991), for countertenor or contralto, tenor, SATB choir, and organ [20']
 "Western Wind" Kyrie (1991), for SATB choir [3'] (also for soli)
 The Cry of the Prophet Zephaniah (1992), for solo baritone, TB choir, 2 trumpets, 2 trombones, and 2 cellos [7']
 Vertue (1993), for unison soprano or children's choir, and piano [9']
 Golden Sleep (1996), for solo tenor, baritone, and SATB choir [12']
 Palm Sunday (1999–2003), for SATB choir, guitar, vibraphone, double bass, and piano [10']
 This Church (2001), "for mezzo-soprano and baritone soloists, 2 narrators, choir, organ, handbells [handbell choir] and ensemble" [66']
 Descriptive Jottings of London (2003), for 3 voices (or choir), accordion, and piano [5']
 Voluala (2004), for SATB choir and organ [4']
 Forget-me-not (published 2005), for SATB choir and ensemble (guitar, suspended cymbal, double bass, and piano) [6']
 Favourite Poets (published 2006), for SATB choir, organ, and ensemble (2 horns, timpani, harp, violin, 2 violas, 2 cellos, and double bass) [20']
 Comfortable Words (2006), for SATB choir and organ [5']
 Magnificat and Nunc Dimittis (2006), for SSATB choir [10']
 Second Magnificat and Nunc Dimittis (2007), for SATB choir and organ [9']
 Mankind (2007–08), "for two principal male voices (speaker and baritone), 3 smaller male speaking rôles, small chorus of female voices, and ensemble" (flute, clarinet, organ, piano, violin, and cello) [70']
 Gedächtnis-Hymne (premièred 2010), for SATB choir and saxophone quartet [20']
 Telling (recorded 2011), for treble soloist and SATB choir [4']
 Oure Father (published 2013), for SATB choir [5'] 'Y cuán ciegos' (2015/16), for vocal soloist and SATB choir [8']
 John the Baptist (published 2016), for SATB choir and organ [3']
 Dum transisset Sabbatum (2016-18), for mixed choir [13']
 Videte Miraculum (2016-18), for mixed choir [12']
 Easy Things To Do (2018), for choir and piano 4-hands [11']

 Vocal music accompanied by ensemble of 8+ instrumentalists 
 Jeanne d'Arc (1967), for high soprano, tenor, and solo cello, with flute (doubling piccolo), alto flute, alto recorder, horn, soprano saxophone, bass saxophone, guitar, harp, 3 violins, viola, cello, and double bass [18']
 Folk Song Set (in memory of Percy Grainger) (1969–76), version i, for soprano, cor anglais, clarinet (doubling E-flat clarinet), flugelhorn, percussion, 2 violins, viola, cello, and double bass [15']
 Mr Punch (1976–79), for speaker, flute, oboe or clarinet, percussion, piano, and violin or cello [21']
 Mystery 2, "The Earthly Paradise" (1977–78), for mezzo-soprano, tenor, bass, 2 actors, 2 piccolos, alto recorder, oboe (doubling oboe d'amore), cor anglais, 4 trumpets, 2 celestas, 3 percussionists, 2 violas, 2 cellos, double bass [14']
 Mystery 5, "The Parliament of Heaven" (1977–78), for 3 sopranos, mezzo-soprano, tenor, 3 choirs, children's choir, alto recorder, oboe, 4 trumpets, 3 percussionists, harp, viola, and 2 actors [30']
 Mystery 7, "The Betrayal and Crucifixion of Jesus of Nazareth" (1978–79), for 2 sopranos, mezzo-soprano, tenor, 6 speakers, 2 soprano recorders, 2 piccolos (the second doubling alto flute), oboe d'amore, cor anglais, trumpet, 3 percussionists, 2 celestas, harp, 6 violins, cello
 Vaudeville (1983/87), for mezzo-soprano, baritone, 2 dancers, clarinet, bassoon, flugelhorn, trombone, percussion, violin, and double bass [38']
 Celi (1984/97), for 2 high sopranos, 3 flutes, 3 violas, and 2 harps [15']
 The Undivine Comedy, an opera in 17 scenes (1985–88/89), for soprano, mezzo-soprano, tenor, 2 baritones, 2 flutes (one doubling on piccolo, the other on alto flute), 2 oboes (one doubling on cor anglais), clarinet (doubling on E-flat clarinet and bass clarinet), 2 percussionists, electric organ (doubling on celesta), violin, viola, and cello [114']
 The Transgressive Gospel (2008–09), for 2 singers, violin, viola, cello, accordion, cimbalom, and piano [120']

 Music with tape and/or electronics 
 Nowhere else to go (1989), for clarinet, trumpet, percussion, cello, synthesizer, tape (or synthesizer), and electronics [15']
 Same as We (1990), version i, for soprano and tape [10']
 Recent Britain (1997–98), for piano obbligato, and 1–3 of the following: clarinet (or flute, oboe, or violin); bassoon (or cello or trombone); cello (or bassoon or trombone); with tapes by each performer [25'] (see also "Open instrumentation")
 Confusion in the service of discovery (2000), for mandolin and 2 pre-recorded mandolins [8']
 Marilyn, Brian, Mike and the cats (2004), for clarinet, piano, and pre-recorded cats [6']
 Third String Quartet (2007–09), "for string quartet and pre-recorded birdsong" [40']

 Open instrumentation 
 n (1969–72), for 1-4 players playing instruments of different ranges [8']
 Runnin' Wild (1978), for solo oboe, saxophone, clarinet, or bass clarinet [8']
 Moon's goin' down (1980), for "any solo wind instrument or voice" [4']
 Piano Concerto No. 7 (1981), for solo piano, and 1–5 members of a wind quintet (flute, oboe, clarinet, bassoon, horn) [11']
 WAM (1990–91), for piano, a treble instrument, and a bass instrument (e.g. flute, bass clarinet, and piano) [15']
 Plain Harmony (1993), version i, for any combination of multiple instruments [10']
 Recent Britain (1997–98), for piano obbligato, and 1–3 of the following: clarinet (or flute, oboe, or violin); bassoon (or cello or trombone); cello (or bassoon or trombone); with tapes by each performer [25'] (see also "Music with tape and/or electronics")
 False notions of progress (1997), for any 3 instruments
 Marcel Duchamp, the Picabias and Apollinaire Attend a Performance of 'Impressions d'Afrique' by Raymond Roussel at the Théâtre Antoine (1999–2000), for speaking pianist and ensemble (flute, trombone, percussion, cello, and 2nd piano, all with possible substitutions)
 Ettelijke bange eenden (2001), for 3 keyboards, and 1 or 2 duos of instruments (the 1st duo 'legato' instruments, the 2nd 'staccato,' or otherwise contrasting, instruments), all not mutually in tune
 Hoe weinig begrijpen wij (2001), for free ensemble
 Notre Dame Polyphony (2001–02), for free ensemble of 6 or 9 players [8']
 Amphithéâtre des Sciences Mortes (2001–02), for soloist and free ensemble [7']
 Éros uranien (2002), for free ensemble
 Sorrow and its beauty (2002), version i, for free ensemble
 Ceci n'est pas une forme (2003), for soloist and piano quartet (violin, viola, cello, and piano) [6']
 Seterjentens fridag (2003), for hardanger fiddle (or violin) with optional accompaniment (reed organ and/or piano, live and/or recorded, and/or instrumental quartet) [7']
 Von Gloeden Postcards (2003), for piano and optional accompaniment by unspecified instruments (also for solo piano)
 Post-Christian Survival Kit (2003–05), for free ensemble (including 1+ keyboards, 1+ voices, and 1+ percussion)
 Molly-House (2004), for free ensemble (including soloists, keyboards, and electric household devices)
 Vigany's Cabinet (2004–05), for 2–6 trios of instruments [10–20']
 Back on Earth (2005), for free ensemble [6']
 Visualise Love (2006), for SATB voices and optional piano 4-hands
 Not sure (2006), for SSATB voices [3']
 Déjà fait (2006), for free ensemble
 Après-Midi Dada (2006), for 2 keyboards, 2–5 wind instruments, 2–8 plucked instruments, 2–8 percussionists, coffee grinder, and (optionally nude) actors [15']
 Not envious of rabbits (2006), for free ensemble [5']
 Martha Gunn (2007), for "3 high-register wind instruments, water gongs and (silent) actors in and out of bathing-costumes"
 Yso (2007), "for various instrumental configurations
 D.O.S. (2008), for 2 instruments and keyboard [3']
 Viitasaari (2009), for kantele, piano, and 2 treble instruments [4']
 Late Hey with three Bees (2014), for 2 treble instruments and buzzing instruments [1']
 Maat Strikt (2016), for soloist and ensemble [16']

References 

Finnissy, Michael